Albert Baernstein II (25 April 1941,  Birmingham, Alabama – 10 June 2014, University City, Missouri) was an American mathematician.

Education and career
Baernstein matriculated at the University of Alabama, but after a year there he transferred to  Cornell University, where he received his bachelor's degree in 1962. After working for a year for an insurance company, he became a graduate student in mathematics at the University of Wisconsin-Madison, where he received his master's degree in 1964 and Ph.D. in 1968.

Baernstein was from 1968 to 1972 an assistant professor at Syracuse University and from 1972 to 2011 a professor at Washington University in St. Louis, where he retired as professor emeritus.

Contributions
The main focus of Baernstein's was analysis, especially function theory and symmetrization problems. His most important contribution is now called the Baernstein star-function. He originally introduced the star-function to solve an extremal problem posed by Albert Edrei in Nevanlinna theory. Later, the star-function was applied by Baernstein and others to several different extremal problems.

In 1978 he was an Invited Speaker with talk How the *-function solves extremal problems at the ICM in Helsinki. He supervised 15 doctoral students, including Juan J. Manfredi.

Selected publications

with Eric T. Sawyer: 

with Daniel Girela and José Ángel Peláez:

References

20th-century American mathematicians
21st-century American mathematicians
Cornell University alumni
University of Alabama alumni
University of Wisconsin–Madison alumni
Washington University in St. Louis faculty
Washington University in St. Louis mathematicians
1941 births
2014 deaths
People from Birmingham, Alabama